Vittorio Cottafavi (30 January 1914 – 14 December 1998) was an Italian film director and screenwriter. He directed 70 films between 1943 and 1985. His film Il diavolo sulle colline was screened in the Un Certain Regard section at the 1985 Cannes Film Festival.

Selected filmography

  (1943)
 The Gates of Heaven (1945) (actor)
 The Sun Still Rises (1946)
 The Unknown Man of San Marino (1946)
 Fire Over the Sea (1947)
 La grande strada (1948)
 The Flame That Will Not Die (1949)
 A Woman Has Killed (1952)
 Milady and the Musketeers (1952)
 Traviata '53 (1953)
 A Free Woman (1954)
 It Takes Two to Sin in Love (1954)
 Messalina (1960)
 Hercules and the Conquest of Atlantis (1961)
 100 Horsemen (1964)
 Il diavolo sulle colline (1985)

References

External links

1914 births
1998 deaths
Italian film directors
20th-century Italian screenwriters
Film people from Modena
Italian male screenwriters
20th-century Italian male writers